Chrysolampus elegans is a species of chalcid wasps with a Nearctic distribution.

References

External links 

 
 Chrysolampus elegans at insectoid.info

Chalcidoidea
Insects described in 1986